The Women competition at the 2018 World Allround Speed Skating Championships was held on 9 and 10 March 2018.

Results

500 m
The race was started on 9 March at 19:30.

3000 m
The race was started on 9 of March at 20:24.

1500 m
The race was started on 10 March at 17:00.

5000 m
The race was started on 10 March at 21:06.

Overall standings
After all events.

References

Women
speed skating